This is a chronological list of projects with significant contributions from P-Funk members. It also features notable pre-P-Funk and post-P-Funk projects from these members. The name of the P-Funk band or member is listed in bold.

1950s

1956 
The Parliaments - "Sunday Kind Of Love"/"The Wind" (10")

1959 
The Parliaments - "Poor Willie/Party Boys" (APT 25036) (7")

1960s

1960
The Parliaments -Lonely Island (Flipp 45–100) (7")

1965 
Little Oovy Groovy, Ten Cent Movie
The Parliaments record demos for Motown
Roy Handy - "Monkey See, Monkey Do"/"Baby, That's A Groove" (Stephanye 334) (7")

1966 
November
The Parliaments - Heart Trouble/That Was My Girl (Golden World Records GW-46) (7")

Darrell Banks - "Open The Door To Your Heart"/"Our Love (Is In The Pocket)" (Revilot 201) (7")
J.J. Barnes - "Day Tripper"/"Don't Bring Me Bad News" (Ric Tic 115) (7")
The Debonaires - "Loving You Takes All Of My Time" (Solid Hit 102) (7")
The Fantastic Four - "Girl Have Pity"/"Live Up To What She Thinks" (Ric Tic 119) (7")
Pat Lewis - "Can't Shake It Loose"/"Let's Go Together" (Golden World 42) (7")
Pat Lewis - "Look At What I Almost Missed"/"No Baby, No" (Solid Hitbound 101) (7")
Theresa Lindsay - "I'll Bet You"/"Daddy-O" (Golden World 43) (7")

1967 
The Parliaments - (I Wanna) Testify/I Can Feel The Ice Melting (Revilot RV 207)  (7")
The Parliaments - "All Your Goodies Are Gone (The Loser's Seat)"/"Don't Be Sore At Me" (Revilot RV 211)  (7")
The Parliaments - "Little Man"/"The Goose (That Laid The Golden Egg)" (Revilot RV 214) (7")
The Parliaments - "Look At What I Almost Missed"/"What Have You Been Growing" (Revilot RV 217) (7")
The Debonaires - "Headache In My Heart"/"I'm In Love Again" (Solid Hitbound 104) (7")
Flaming Embers - "Hey Mama (What'cha Got Good For Daddy)"/"Let's Have A Love In (Cause Everybody Needs Love)" (Ric Tic 132) (7")
Pat Lewis - "I'll Wait"/"Warning" (Solid Hitbound 105) (7")
Pat Lewis - "Baby, I Owe You Something Good"/"The Loser" (Solid Hitbound 112) (7")

1968 
April 27
J.J. Barnes - "Our Love Is In The Pocket"/"All Your Goodies Are Gone (instr.)" (Revilot RV 222) (7")
The Parliaments - "Good Ole Music"/"Time" (Revilot RV 223) (7")
The Parliaments - "A New Day Begins"/"I'll Wait" (Revilot RV 228) (7")
Rose Williams with George Clinton And The Funkedelics - "Whatever Makes My Baby Feel Good"/"Whatever Makes My Baby Feel Good (instr.)" (Funkedelic 6709) (7")

J.J. Barnes - "So Called Friends" (Revilot 225) (7")
The Holidays  - "All That Is Required"/"I'll Keep Coming Back" (Revilot 226) (7")

1969 
The Parliaments - "A New Day Begins"/"I'll Wait" (Atco 6675) (7")
Funkadelic - "Music For My Mother"/"Music For My Mother (instr.)" (Westbound W 148) (7")
Funkadelic - "Can't Shake It Loose"/"As Good As I Can Feel" (Westbound W 149) unreleased until 1993
Funkadelic - 7" "I'll Bet You"/"Qualify And Satisfy" (Westbound W 150) (7")
Funkadelic - 7" "I'll Bet You"/"Open Our Eyes" (Westbound W 150) (7")
Funkadelic - Funkadelic (Westbound 2000) (LP)
July
The Parliaments appear on a PBS television series entitled Say Brother based in Boston. They perform "Testify" and an early version of "What Is Soul?"

1970s

1970 
April
Funkadelic - "I Got A Thing, You Got A Thing, Everybody's Got A Thing"/"Fish, Chips And Sweat" (Westbound W 158) (7")
A Parliament Thang - "I Call My Baby Pussycat"/"Little Ole Country Boy" (Invictus Is 9077) (7")
July
Parliament - Osmium (Invictus) (LP)
October
Funkadelic - Free Your Mind...And Your Ass Will Follow (Westbound 2001) (LP)
Ruth Copeland - Self Portrait (Invictus) (LP)
Funkadelic - "I Wanna Know If It's Good To You"/"I Wanna Know If It's Good To You (instr.)" (Westbound W 167) (7")

1971 
Funkadelic - "You And Your Folks, Me And My Folks"/"Funky Dollar Bill" (Westbound W 175) (7")
Parliament - "Livin' The Life"/"The Silent Boatman" (Invictus INV 513 [UK]) (7")
May
Parliament - "Red Hot Mama"/"Little Ole Country Boy" (Invictus Is-9091) (7")
July
Parliament - "Breakdown"/"Little Ole Country Boy" (Invictus Is-9095) (7")
Funkadelic - Maggot Brain (Westbound 2007) (LP)
Ruth Copeland - I Am What I Am (Invictus) (LP)
Funkadelic - "Can You Get To That"/"Back In Our Minds" (Westbound W 185) (7")
December
House Guests - "What So Never The Dance pt. 1"/"What So Never The Dance  pt. 2" (7") William "Bootsy" Collins, Phelps "Catfish" Collins, and Frank "Kash" Waddy
House Guests - "My Mind Set Me Free pt. 1"/"My Mind Set Me Free  pt. 2" (7") William "Bootsy" Collins, Phelps "Catfish" Collins, and Frank "Kash" Waddy

1972 
U.S. music with Funkadelic - "I Miss My Baby"/"Baby I Owe You Something Good" (Westbound W 197) (7")
Funkadelic - "Hit It And Quit It"/"A Whole Lot Of BS" (Westbound W 198) (7")
Parliament - "Come In Out Of The Rain"/"Little Ole Country Boy" (Invictus Is-9123) (7")
Parliament - "Come In Out Of The Rain" (Invictus INV 522 [UK]) (7")
Parliament record "Loose Booty", "Fantasy Is Reality", and an "Unfinished Instrumental" that were not released until Osmium was reissued on CD in the 1990s
May
Funkadelic - America Eats Its Young (Westbound 2022) (LP)
Funkadelic - "Loose Booty"/"A Joyful Process" (Westbound W 205) (7")
June
The J.B.'s - Food For Thought (Polydor 5601) (LP) William "Bootsy" Collins, Phelps "Catfish" Collins, Frank "Kash" Waddy, and Fred Wesley
Bootsy, Phelps And The Complete Strangers - "Fun In Your Thang pt. 1"/"Fun In Your Thang  pt. 2" (Philmore Sound R-30135/6) (7") William "Bootsy" Collins, Phelps "Catfish" Collins, Frank "Kash" Waddy, and Gary "Mudbone" Cooper
Bootsy, Phelps And Gary - "Together In Heaven pt. 1"/"Together In Heaven  pt. 2" (Philmore Sound 740536) (7") William "Bootsy" Collins, Phelps "Catfish" Collins, Frank "Kash" Waddy, and Gary "Mudbone" Cooper (7")

1973 
July
Funkadelic - Cosmic Slop (Westbound 2022) (LP)
Funkadelic - "Cosmic Slop"/"If You Don't Like The Effect, Don't Produce The Cause" (Westbound W 218) (7")

1974 
Parliament - "Up for the Down Stroke" (Casablanca NB 9003) (LP)
Funkadelic - Standing on the Verge of Getting It On (Westbound) (LP)
Funkadelic - "Standing On The Verge Of Getting It On"/"Jimmy's Got A Little Bit Of Bitch In Him" (Westbound W 224) (7")
June
Parliament - "Up For The Down Stroke"/"Presence Of A Brain" (Casablanca NB 803) (7")
August
Parliament - Up for the Down Stroke (Casablanca NBLP 7002) (LP)
November
Parliament - "Testify"/"I Can Move You" (Casablanca NB 811) (7")

1975 
Funkadelic - "Red Hot Mamma"/"Vital Juices" (Westbound W 5000) (7")
April
Funkadelic - Let's Take It to the Stage (Westbound 215) (LP)
Parliament - Chocolate City (Casablanca NBLP-7014) (LP)
May
Parliament - "Chocolate City"/"Chocolate City (long version)" (Casablanca NB 831) (7")
Funkadelic - "Better By The Pound"/"Stuffs And Things" (Westbound WT-5014) (7")
Funkadelic - "Let's Take It To The Stage"/"Biological Speculation" (Westbound WT-2026) (7")
Funkadelic - Funkadelic's Greatest Hits (Westbound) (LP)
September
Parliament - "Ride On"/"Big Footin'" (Casablanca NB 843) (7")

1976 
February
Parliament - Mothership Connection (Casablanca 7022) (LP)
April
Bootsy's Rubber Band - Stretchin' Out in Bootsy's Rubber Band (Warner Bros. 2920) (LP)
Parliament-  Give Up the Funk (Tear the Roof off the Sucker) (Casblanca NB 856) (7")
September
Parliament - The Clones of Dr. Funkenstein (Casablanca NBP-7034) (LP)
September 26
Funkadelic - Hardcore Jollies (Warner Bros. 2973) (LP)
Funkadelic - Tales of Kidd Funkadelic (Westbound 227) (LP)
Funkadelic - "Undisco Kidd"/"How Do Yeaw View You" (Westbound WT-5029) (7")
Fuzzy Haskins - A Whole Nother Thang (Westbound 229) (LP)
December 18
Parliament - "Star Child"/"Supergroovalisticprosifunkstication" (Casablanca NB 864) (7")

1977 
January
Bootsy's Rubber Band - Ahh... The Name Is Bootsy, Baby! (Warner Bros. 2972) (LP)
Funkadelic - The Best of the Early Years, Vol. 1 (Westbound) (LP)
Eddie Hazel - Game, Dames and Guitar Thangs (Warner Bros.) (LP)
Fred Wesley And The Horny Horns - A Blow for Me, A Toot for You (Atlantic 18214) (LP)
 May 5
Parliament - Live: P-Funk Earth Tour (Casablanca 7053) (LP)
 November 28
Parliament - Funkentelechy Vs. the Placebo Syndrome (Casablanca NBP-7084) (LP)

1978 
January
Parliament - "Flash Light"/"Swing Down Sweet Chariot" (Casablanca 909) (7")
Bootsy's Rubber Band - Bootzilla 	Warner Bros. 8512 (7")
February
Bootsy's Rubber Band - Bootsy? Player of the Year (Warner Bros. 3093) (LP)
April 15
The Brides of Funkenstein - Funk Or Walk (Atlantic 19201) (LP)
Fuzzy Haskins - Radio Active (Westbound 6102) (LP)
Parlet - Pleasure Principle (Casablanca 7094) (LP)
Bernie Worrell - All the Woo in the World (Arista Records 4209) (LP)
May
Parliament - "Funkentelechy"/"Funkentelechy pt. 2" (Casablanca 921) (7")
August
Funkadelic - "One Nation Under A Groove"/"One Nation Under A Groove pt. 2" (Warner Bros. 8618) (7")
Quazar - "Funk 'N' Roll (Dancin In The Funkshine)" (Arista 0349) (7")
September
Quazar - Quazar (Arista Records) (LP)
Funkadelic- One Nation Under a Groove (Warner Brothers Records BSK 3209) (LP)
November
Parliament - Motor Booty Affair (Casablanca NBP-7125) (LP)
Parliament - "Aqua Boogie (A Psychoalphadiscobetabioaquadoloop)"/"You're A Fish And I'm A Water Sign" (Casablanca 950) (7")

1979 
Funkadelic - Uncle Jam Wants You (Warner Bros.) (LP)
Parlet - Invasion of the Booty Snatchers (Casablanca NBP-7146) (LP)
Parliament - Gloryhallastoopid (or Pin the Tail on the Funky) (Casablanca NBP-7195) (LP)
Brides Of Funkenstein - Never Buy Texas From A Cowboy (Atlantic 19261) (LP)
Fred Wesley And The Horny Horns - Say Blow By Blow Backwards (Atlantic) (LP)
July
Bootsy's Rubber Band - This Boot Is Made for Fonk-N (Warner Bros. 3295) (LP)
Mutiny - Mutiny On The Mamaship (CBS) (LP)

1980s

1980 
Sweat Band - Sweat Band (Uncle Jam 36857) (LP)
Parlet - Play Me or Trade Me (Casablanca 7224) (LP)
Parliament - Trombipulation (Casablanca NBP-7249) (LP)
Philippé Wynne - Wynne Jammin' (Uncle Jam/CBS Records) (LP)
November
Bootsy - Ultra Wave (Warner Bros. 3433) (LP)
Zapp - Zapp (Warner Bros. 3463)  (LP) William "Bootsy" Collins

1981 
March
Funkadelic - The Electric Spanking of War Babies (Warner Bros. 3482) (LP)
Funkadelic - Connections & Disconnections (LAX 37087) (LP)
Godmoma - Godmoma Here (LP)
Space Cadets - Space Cadets (Vanguard CSD 79442) (LP) Bernie Worrell and Tyrone Lampkin

1982 
May
William "Bootsy" Collins - The One Giveth, the Count Taketh Away (Warner Bros. 3667) (LP)
November 5
George Clinton - Computer Games (Capitol 12246) (LP)

1983 
P-Funk All Stars - Urban Dancefloor Guerillas (CBS Records 39168) (LP)
December
George Clinton - You Shouldn't-Nuf Bit Fish (Capitol 7123081) (LP)

1984 
Eramus Hall - Gohead (LP)
Chops Horns - Chops (Atlantic Records) (LP) Darryl Dixon and Dennis Chambers
Funkadelic records By Way Of The Drum for MCA Records, eventually released in March 2007

1985 
July
George Clinton - Some of My Best Jokes Are Friends (Capitol CDP 7 96356 2) (LP)
Jimmy G. And The Tackheads - Federation Of Tackheads (Capitol Records) (LP)
 December 7
Artists United Against Apartheid - Sun City (Manhattan ST-53019) (LP) George Clinton

1986 
May
George Clinton - R&B Skeletons in the Closet (Capitol CDP 7 96267 2) (LP)
George Clinton/Parliament/Funkadelic - The Mothership Connection - Live from Houston Capitol MLP-15021 (LP)
September
George Clinton - The Best Of George Clinton Capitol ST-12534

1987 
April 17
Nona Hendryx - Female Trouble (album) (EMI CDP 7 46550 2) (LP) George Clinton and Bernie Worrell
Sly & Robbie - Rhythm Killers (Island Records BRCD 512) (LP) William "Bootsy" Collins, Bernie Worrell, and Gary "Mudbone" Cooper
Mico Wave - Cookin' From The Inside Out!!! (Columbia Records AL 40909) (LP)  William "Bootsy" Collins, Bernie Worrell, Phelps "Catfish" Collins, and Maceo Parker

1988 
Bootsy Collins - What's Bootsy Doin'? (CBS 462918 2) (CD)
INCorporated Thang Band - Lifestyles Of The Roach And Famous (Warner Bros. 9 25617-2) (CD)
Well Red - Respect Due (Virgin Records CDV 2548) (CD)  George Clinton

1989 
August 7
George Clinton - The Cinderella Theory (Warner Bros./Paisley Park 925 994-2) (CD)
George Clinton - "Why Should I Dog U Out?" (Warner Bros./Paisley Park PRO-CD-3438) (CD single)
George Clinton - "Tweakin'" (Warner Bros./Paisley Park) (12")
October 17
George Clinton George Clinton Presents Our Gang Funky (MCA Records MCAD-42048) (CD)

1990s

1990 
April
Bootsy's Rubber Band - Jungle Bass (4th & Bway BRECD 550 846 339-2) (CD)
August 20
Prince - Graffiti Bridge (Warner Bros./Paisley Park 7599-27493-2) (CD) George Clinton, Garry Shider, Steve Boyd, Joseph "Amp" Fiddler, Tracey "Treylewd" Lewis, Michael "Clip" Payne, and Belita Woods
Mr. Fiddler - With Respect (Elektra 9 60959-2) (CD)
Bernie Worrell - Funk Of Ages (Gramavision GRV 74602) (CD)
Stevie Salas - Colorcode (Island 91303-2) (CD) William "Bootsy" Collins, Bernie Worrell, and Gary "Mudbone" Cooper
Menace - Doghouse (Bite Records 656.224-2) (CD) William "Bootsy" Collins, Bernie Worrell, Maceo Parker, Michael Hampton, and Gary "Mudbone" Cooper
Limbo Maniacs - Stinky Grooves (In-Effect Records 88561-3015-2)  William "Bootsy" Collins and Maceo Parker

1991 
January 25
Parliament - The Best Nonstop Mix Compilation (Casablanca/Polystar PSCW-1044)
May 28
T.C. Ellis - True Confessions (Warner Bros./Paisley Park 9 27497-2) (CD) George Clinton, Mallia Franklin, Michael "Clip" Payne, Garry Shider, Belita Woods, Paul Hill, Joseph "Amp" Fiddler, and Patricia Lewis
September 30
 -  (Epic Records EPC 468700-2) (CD) Gary "Mudbone" Cooper and Michael "Clip" Payne
Material - The Third Power (Axiom 422-848-417-2) (CD) William "Bootsy" Collins, Gary Shider, Gary "Mudbone" Cooper, Bernie Worrell, Michael Hampton, Fred Wesley, and Maceo Parker
Gotcha! - Words And Music From Da Low Lands (Ariola 262.060) (CD) George Clinton
Ground Zero - Future Of The Funk (Lethal Records LBR112) (CD) William "Bootsy" Collins
Momma Stud - Cockadoodledo (Virgin Records America 2-91627) (CD) Bernie Worrell

1992 
September
Go Fer Yer Funk - George Clinton and the P-Funk All Stars
September 15
Trey Lewd - Drop The Line (Reprise 9 26319-2) (CD)
September 29
Praxis - Transmutation (Mutatis Mutandis) (Axiom 314-512-338-2) (CD) William "Bootsy" Collins and Bernie Worrell
Hardware (band) - Third Eye Open (Hardware album) (Rykodisc RCD 10304) (CD) William "Bootsy" Collins, George Clinton, and Gary "Mudbone" Cooper
Music For Your Mother - Funkadelic (Westbound CDSEW2 055) (CD)

1993 
January
George Clinton - Sample Some Of Disc Sample Some Of Dat Volume 1 (AEM 25701) (CD)
May 28
George Clinton - "Bubble Gum Gangster" (AEM 25661) (CD single)
The Goombas Featuring George Clinton - "Walk the Dinosaur" (Capitol CDCL 693) (CD)
June 28
O. G. Funk - Out of the Dark (Billy Bass Nelson album) (Rykodisc RCD 10303) (CD)
July 22
Umar Bin Hassan - Be Bop Or Be Dead (Island/Axiom 314-518 048-2) (CD) William "Bootsy" Collins and Bernie Worrell
August 30
Dance On The Wild Side (AEM 25691-2) (CD)
October 12
George Clinton - Hey Man, Smell My Finger (Warner Bros./Paisley Park 9-25518-2) (CD)
Parliament Funkadelic P Funk Allstars-Greatest Hits Live-1972-1993 (AEM 25821-2) (CD)
December 13
George Clinton - "Martial Law (Hey Man Smell My Finger)" (Warner Bros./Paisley Park PRO-CD-5998-R) (CD single)
George Clinton - "Paint the white house black" (Warner Bros./Paisley Park 9362-41057-2) (CD single)
George Clinton - Sample Some Of Disc Sample Some Of Dat Volume 2 (AEM 25741) (CD)
Parliament Funkadelic P Funk Allstars - Dope Dog (One Nation Records) (CD)
Bernie Worrell - Blacktronic Science (Gramavision R279474) (CD)
Bernie Worrell - Pieces Of Woo: The Other Side (CMP CD 65) (CD)
Andre Foxxe - I'm Funk And I'm Proud (Blues Interaction PCD-2834) (CD)
Zillatron - Lord of the Harvest (Rykodisc 10301) (CD)
The Last Poets - Holy Terror (album) (Rykodisc RCD 10319) (CD) William "Bootsy" Collins, Bernie Worrell, and George Clinton
Parliament-Funkadelic-Live 1976-1993 (Japan pressing) (P-Vine PCD-2755)

1994 
Eddie Hazel - Jams From The Heart (JDC 3452-2) (CD)
Eddie Hazel - Rest in P (P-Vine PCD-2884) (CD)
Bootsy's New Rubber Band - Blasters of the Universe (Rykodisc RCD90307/08) (CD)
George Clinton & The P-Funk All Stars P-Funk Unreleased Remix (P-Vine PCD-2752) (CD)
P-Funk Guitar Army - Tribute To Jimi Hendrix Vol. 1 (P-Vine PCD-2827) (CD)
Tribute To Jimi Hendrix / Return Of The Gypsy (P-Vine PCD-2847) (CD)
Parliament Funkadelic-Live 1976-1993 (UK pressing) (Sequel NEF CD 273)
May 2
George Clinton Parliament Funkadelic - Music From The Motion Picture PCU (Fox Records 07822-10009-2) (CD)
May 20
Fred Wesley And The Horny Horns - The Final Blow (Sequel Records NED CD 270) (CD)
June 28
Slave Master - Under The 6 (Rykodisc RCD 10319) Michael Hampton and Gary "Mudbone" Cooper
July 20
George Clinton - Sample Some Of Disc Sample Some Of Dat Volume 3 (AEM 25881) (CD)
August
Bootsy Collins-Back in the Day: The Best of Bootsy (Warner Archives 9 26581-2) (CD)
December 6
Parliament - Funkadelic - P-Funk All Stars - Dope Dogs (P-Vine PCD-1991) (CD)
Praxis - Sacrifist (Subharmonic SD 7002-2) (CD) William "Bootsy" Collins and Bernie Worrell

1995 
February 28
Dave Stewart - Greetings From The Gutter (East West Records 61735-2) (CD) Bernie Worrell, William "Bootsy" Collins, Gary "Mudbone" Cooper, and Jerome "Bigfoot" Brailey
April 11
Friday Original Motion Picture Soundtrack (Priority 7243 8 40412 2 9) (CD) includes "You Got Me Wide Open" by Bootsy Collins and Bernie Worrell
July 18
Funkcronomicon (Axiom 314-524 077-2) (CD)
August
Bottom Jack: The Bass Project-Volume One (P-Vine PCD-4741) "Hanging Around"-Andre Foxxe featuring Flea.
September
Bottom Jack: The Bass Project-Volume Two (P-Vine PCD-4742)
"Pretty Girl", "L.O.V.E. Baby"-Rodney "Skeet" Curtis; "The Final Frontier-Bill Laswell and Bootsy Collins
October
Tal Ross - a.k.a. Detrimental Vasoline - Giant Shirley (Coconut Grove VGRC 9184-2) (CD)
Bottom Jack: The Bass Project-Volume Three (P-Vine PCD-4743)
"Jealous Hunts Love", "Bassically Speaking"-Andre Foxxe; "I'd Rather Be With You"(Live)-Bootsy's Rubber Band
October 24
In From The Storm - The Music Of Jimi Hendrix (BMG 74321 31550 2) (CD) includes a cover of "Purple Haze" by a group of musicians that includes William "Bootsy" Collins, Bernie Worrell, and Dennis Chambers
Panther - The Original Motion Picture Soundtrack (Mercury 525 479-2) (CD) includes "Black People" by Funkadelic featuring George Clinton and Belita Woods
Working Class Hero: A Tribute to John Lennon (Hollywood HR-62015-2) (CD) includes a cover of "Mind Games" by George Clinton
Mallia Franklin - Funken Tersepter (Blues Interaction PCD 4801) (CD)
Third Rail - South Delta Space Age (PolyGram 314 533 965-2) (CD) Bernie Worrell
Bootsy Collins & Bootsy's New Rubber Band - Keepin' Dah Funk Alive 4-1995 (Rykodisc RCD 90323/24) (CD)
December 25
George Clinton and Parliament Funkadelic - Mothership Connection Newberg Session (Blues Interactions PCD-4778) (CD)

1996 
February 27
Mutiny - Aftershock 2005 (Rykodisc RCD 10334) (CD)
June
George Clinton & The P-Funk Allstars - T.A.P.O.A.F.O.M. (Epic/550 Music 483833 2) (CD)
October 29
George Clinton - Greatest Funkin' Hits (Capitol 7243 8 33911 2 7) (CD)
Funkadelic - Live: Meadowbrook, Rochester, Michigan – 12th September 1971 (Westbound CDSEWD 108) (CD)
September 22
Enemy Squad - "Bob Dole Is on Drugs"/"If It Fits" (12") Gabe Gonzalez, Michael "Clip" Payne, Steve Boyd, Belita Woods, and George Clinton
Frogg - Froggadelic (Westbound WB CD-8005) (CD) Louie "Babblin'" Kababbie

1997 
August 26
Kyle Jason - Generations (Sony Music 488538 2) (CD) William "Bootsy" Collins, Joseph "Amp" Fiddler, Ron Wright, and Steve Boyd "Paul Hill"
Bootsy Collins - Fresh Outta 'P' University (WEA 3984 20262-2) (CD)
Bernie Worrell - Free Agent: A Spaced Odyssey (Polystar PSCR-5609) (CD)
George Clinton & The P-Funk All Stars - Live... And Kickin' (Intersound Inc. 9284) (CD)
Enemy Squad - United State Of... Mind (Tuf America Records USACD 8500) (CD) DeWayne "Blackbyrd" McKnight, Joseph "Amp" Fiddler, Michael "Clip" Payne, Steve Boyd, Belita Woods, "Paul Hill"Louie "Babblin'" Kababbie, Gabe Gonzalez, and  George Clinton
Enemy Squad - "Return of the Swamp Thang"/"Prankster Boogie" (Tuf America Records) (12")

1998 
April 7
George Clinton - "Get Yo Ass In The Water And Swim Like Me" (Douglas Music ADC16) (CD single)
August 25
Bill Laswell - Jazzonia (Douglas Music ADC 18) (CD) William "Bootsy" Collins
November 24
Groovegrass - Groovegrass 101 Featuring Groovegrass Boyz (Reprise Records 9 47238-2) (CD) William "Bootsy" Collins

1999 
March 2
Original P - What Dat Shakin' (Westbound CDSEWM126) (CD)
March 16
Rick Gardner - The Gardner Of Funk (A U Recordings AUR CD 3069) (CD)
Rick Gardner - The Gardner Of Funk 2 (A U Recordings AUR CD 3079) (CD)
April 20
Buckethead - Monsters and Robots (Higher Octave COCD 47499) (CD) William "Bootsy" Collins
Cacophonic FM - After The Smoke Cleared (WEFUNK Records And Filmworks 2K AD-1) (CD)
November 9
Steve Boyd - 4:20 Drive Time " Paul Hill" (Graduate Records 7 83707 27642 7) (CD)
December 15
The Enemy Squad Presents Ultra Unit - The Angel Dust Theory (R.U.D.E. Records) (CD) Gabe Gonzalez, Dawn Silva, Steve Boyd, Joseph "Amp" Fiddler, and George Clinton

2000s

2000 
April 18
Dawn Silva - All My Funky Friends (Silva Sound 0 93652 32142 5) (CD)
Funk Kin - Funk Kin (J-Bird Records 6 1746 80351-2) (CD) Garry Shider

2001 
August 16
Drugs - The Prescription For Mis-America (WEFUNK Records And Filmworks 2K-AD1-Rx) (CD)
Original P - Introducing Hyped Up Westbound Soljaz (Westbound WBCD-1116) (CD)
George Clinton: The Mothership Connection (Pioneer Artists-PA-11664) (DVD)
"Paul Hill" Cd

2002 
June 11
Garry Shider - Diaperman Goes Starchild (Rawfunk Records & Filmworks) (CD)
Garry Shider - Diaperman, The Second Coming (Rawfunk Records & Filmworks) (CD)
Michael Hampton - Heavy Metal Funkason - The Domestic Grip (Rawfunk Records & Filmworks) (CD)
Lige Curry - An Introspective (CD)
Lige Curry - 4-Track Treasure Part II "And It Don't Stop Now!!" (CD)
Andre Foxxe - Myllenium (Rawfunk Records & Filmworks) (CD)
Frankie "Kash" Waddy - Ka$h Up Front (Rawfunk Records & Filmworks) (CD)
Sheila Horne - 7 Roses (Rawfunk Records & Filmworks) (CD)
November 24
Prince - One Nite Alone... Live! (NPG Records) (CD) Maceo Parker, Greg Boyer, and George Clinton

2003 
November 19
Bootsy Collins - Play With Bootsy (East West Records 0927-49173-2) (CD)
Kendra - Myriadmorphonicbiocorpomelodicrealityshapeshifter (The C Kunspyruhzy 8 82137 00012 8) (CD)
Sativa - Jersey Girl (The C Kunspyruhzy 8 82137 00022 7) (CD)
Kim Manning - Begin Seed (PseudoHippie Records) (CD)
Lili Haydn - Light Blue Sun (Private Music 82876-50931-2) (CD)

2004 
April 20
Octavepussy featuring George Clinton & Parliament Funkadelic - (The Life of The) Funkshipz Captain (Funk To The Max) George Clinton, Garry "Doo Wop" Shider, Michael "Kidd Funkadelic" Hampton, Dwayne "Blackbyrd" McKnight, Joel "Razor Sharp" Johnson, Gary "Mudbone" Cooper, Robert "P-Nut" Johnson, Greg Thomas
September 21
Colonel Claypool's Bucket of Bernie Brains - The Big Eyeball in the Sky (Prawn Song Records PSR-0006-3) (CD) Bernie Worrell

2005 

Chops Horns - Blowout (CD) Darryl Dixon, Dennis Chambers, Bernie Worrell, and Greg Fitz
September 1
Danny Bedrosian - Som'n Fierce (BOZFONK MOOSICK) (CD) Garry Shider, Lige Curry, and Michael "Clip" Payne
September 6
George Clinton And The P-Funk All Stars - How Late Do U Have 2BB4UR Absent? - (The C Kunspyruhzy 10) (CD)
Parliament-Funkadelic: One Nation Under A Groove (documentary)

2006 
Eddie Hazel - At Home (With Family) (Private Release Brenda Hazel) (CD)
May 29
Bootsy Collins And The New Rubber Band - Live In Concert 1998 (ABC Entertainment/Charly Films CHF-F1012LF) (DVD/CD)
Sept 1
Danny Bedrosian - Secret Army (BOZFONK MOOSICK) (CD) Lige Curry, DeWayne "Blackbyrd" McKnight, George Clinton, and Michael "Clip" Payne
Kim Manning - "The Love and Light Activation" (pseudohippie records) (CD) "George Clinton", "Eric Mcfadden", "Wally Ingram", "Norwood Fisher", "The Benevento/Russo Duo", "Jason Chang", "Lige Curry", "Greg Thomas", "Gary Shider", "Oneal Mclure", "Nate Oberman"

2007 
Starr Cullars - Starr Cullars (CD) Lige Curry and Michael Hampton
Kacha - "Somebody's Watching You" (Van Record Company 74321 291022) (CD single) William "Bootsy" Collins
Funkadelic - By Way Of The Drum (Hip-O-Select Records) (CD), recorded in 1984
Parliament - The Casablanca Years: 1974-1980 (Universal Music-Japan)
Danny Bedrosian and Secret Army - The Sleaziest of the Greaze double disc (Bozfonk Moosick) Danny Bedrosian, Lige Curry, Rico Lewis, Dewayne McKnight, Michael Payne, and George E. Clinton III

2008
September 16
George Clinton - George Clinton and His Gangsters of Love (CD)
October 7
Funkadelic - Toys
October 27
Freekbass - Junkyard Waltz (Bootsy Collins, Bernie Worrell)
November 11
Science Faxtion - Living on Another Frequency (Bootsy Collins, Bernie Worrell)

2009
April
U.S. Music With Funkadelic
May
Danny Bedrosian and Secret Army-MUZZLE MOOSICK
Features Danny Bedrosian, Garry Shider, Lige Curry, Rico Lewis, Dewayne "Blackbyrd" Mcknight, Michael "Clip" Payne
stubborn Kinda Fellow/ "Paul Hill" (Feat George Clinton)

2010

July
Danny Bedrosian and Secret Army-MONSTER PEACE (Danny Bedrosian, Lige Curry, Rico Lewis, Kendra Foster)

2011

March
Danny Bedrosian-SERI MISTIK (Danny Bedrosian)

2012
Sept 
Danny Bedrosian and Secret Army-LOST FROTH (Danny Bedrosian, Rico Lewis, Lige Curry, Kendra Foster)
December
George Clinton and The P-Funk All-Stars-LIVE IN FRANCE (George Clinton, P-Funk)

2013

September
Danny Bedrosian-SONGS FOR A BETTER TOMORROW (Danny Bedrosian, Belita Woods, Lige Curry, Rico Lewis, Michael Clip Payne)

 
Discographies of American artists
Rhythm and blues discographies
Pop music group discographies